The 6th Thailand National Games (Thai:กีฬาเขตแห่งประเทศไทย ครั้งที่ 6, also known as the 1972 National Games and the 1972 Interprovincial Games) were held in Ratchaburi, Thailand from 2 to 8 December 1972, with contests in 12 sports. These games were the first competition of the new region, Bangkok, formerly part of region 1, and the new member of region 3, Yasothon, formerly part of Ubon Ratchathani.

Emblem
The emblem of the 1972 Thailand National Games was a brown rhombus, with the emblem of Sports Authority of Thailand inside, surrounded by the text

Participating regions
The 8th Thailand National Games represented 10 regions from 71 provinces.

Sports
The 1972 Thailand National Games featured 10 Olympic sports contested at the 1973 Southeast Asian Peninsular Games, 1974 Asian Games and 1972 Summer Olympics. In addition, four non-Olympic sports was featured: badminton, sepak takraw, table tennis and tennis.

References

External links
 Sports Authority of Thailand (SAT)

National Games
Thailand National Games
National Games
Thailand National Games
National Games